Tauno Tattari (1907–1936) was a Finnish journalist and screenwriter.

Selected filmography
 Substitute Wife (1936)

References

Bibliography 
 Pietari Kääpä. Directory of World Cinema: Finland. Intellect Books, 2012.

External links 
 

1907 births
1936 deaths
Finnish screenwriters
People from Tornio
20th-century screenwriters